HLA (formerly known as Tissue Antigens) is a peer-reviewed scientific journal established in 1971. It covers research on allergy and immunology. It is published monthly by John Wiley & Sons and is the official journal of the European Federation for Immunogenetics. In 2016 in changed its name from Tissue Antigens to HLA.

External links
 

Publications established in 1971
Immunology journals
Monthly journals
English-language journals
Wiley (publisher) academic journals